Ladds is an unincorporated community in Bartow County, in the U.S. state of Georgia.

History
The community took its name from Alonzo Ladd, proprietor of the local A. C. Ladd Lime Company.

References

Unincorporated communities in Bartow County, Georgia
Unincorporated communities in Georgia (U.S. state)